Eight ships of the Royal Navy have borne the name HMS Thames, after the River Thames:

  was a 32-gun fifth rate launched in 1758 and broken up in 1803. She was in French hands between 1793 and 1796, when she was known as Tamise.
  was another 32-gun fifth rate, launched in 1805 and broken up in 1816.
  was a cutter tender built in 1805. She became a dockyard craft in 1866 and was renamed YC 2.  She was sold in 1872.
  was a 46-gun fifth rate launched in 1823.  She was converted to a prison ship in 1841, and sank at her moorings in 1863.
  was a  second-class cruiser launched in 1885. She was converted to a depot ship in 1903, and was sold in 1920 to become a training ship at the Cape, being renamed General Botha.  Her name reverted to Thames when she became an accommodation ship in 1942; she was finally scuttled in 1947.
  was a  launched in 1932 and sunk by a mine in 1940.
 , a tugboat in service during World War II
 HMS Thames has since 1949 been the name borne by a sequence of Royal Naval Volunteer Reserve tenders.

See also
  was a bomb ketch that the Bombay Dockyard launched for the Bombay Marine, the naval arm of the British East India Company (EIC). At some point after active service she became a luggage ship; her ultimate fate is unknown.

Citations

References
 



Royal Navy ship names